Harry Carter may refer to:

Harry Carter (actor) (1879–1952), American actor
Harry Benjamin Carter (actor; 1906–1996), American  actor 
Harry Carter (typographer) (1901–1982), English typographer and writer
Harry Carter (politician) (1874–1952), member of the New South Wales Legislative Assembly
Harry Carter (smuggler) (1749–1809), smuggling member of the Carters of Prussia Cove
Harry Carter Stuart (1893–1963), Virginia cattleman and state senator

See also
Harold Carter (disambiguation)
Henry Carter (disambiguation)